Aplysia morio, the Atlantic black sea hare or sooty sea hare, is a species of sea slug, a marine gastropod mollusk in the family Aplysiidae, the sea hares. It lives in warm waters in the Caribbean Sea and off the south and southeastern coast of the United States, where it feeds on seaweed.

Description
It is usually dark chocolate brown to blackish in colour, and sometimes dark lines are visible on the head and flanks. The tentacles are curled and shaped rather like rabbit's ears. They are rich in nerve cells and are equipped with receptor organs. The shell is a fragile disc, hidden within the mantle, and the foot has large flaps at the side called parapodia which are used for swimming.

Distribution and habitat
This species is found in the semi-tropical western Atlantic Ocean. Its range includes the eastern coast of the United States, Bermuda, the West Indies, Florida, the Caribbean Sea, the Gulf of Mexico and Venezuela. It is usually found on rocky surfaces among the algae that it feeds on, but is also found on sandy seabeds.

Ecology
Aplysia morio feeds on algae. In Bermuda juveniles seem to feed almost exclusively on species of the red alga Laurencia, even though there is a wide range of algae to choose from. Adults widen their diet slightly to include Palmaria palmata. The animal either crawls over the seaweed or rears up to grasp the fronds with its radula and the odontophore (cartilage) that supports it. It may also swim, in a manner reminiscent of a manta ray, when looking for food.

An adult is a hermaphrodite that can act as a male and a female at the same time. As the penis of one individual is inserted into the genital opening of another, chains or clusters of mating sea hares can form. The initially spawning individual releases chemical signals that can trigger spawning in others, which may culminate in a mass spawning event. Fertilized eggs hatch and develop into veliger larvae, which drift with the plankton for at least a month and settle onto Laurencia seaweed.

References

External links
 
 

morio
Gastropods described in 1901